801 may refer to:

In general
801 (number)

Years
801 AD, the year in the Common Era
801 BC, the year before the Common Era
801 AUC (48 AD), a year in the Roman Empire's calendar

Places
Area code 801, Salt Lake City, Utah, USA
Route 801; see List of highways numbered 801
801 Helwerthia, a Main-Belt asteroid, the 801st asteroid registered

Military
801 Army General Hospital, Taiwan
801st Air Division, USAF
801st Bombardment Group (Provisional) of WWII
801 Squadron (disambiguation)
, Pacific Forum class patrol vessel of Tuvalu

Transportation
Class 801 (disambiguation) trains
Ferrari 801 F1, 1957 Formula One racecar
801 (New Jersey bus)

Aviation
Flight 801 (disambiguation)
BMW 801, aeroengine
Pipistrel 801 eVTOL, autonomous air taxi

Other uses
IBM 801, a CPU
801 (band), British supergroup
801 AM, radio stations at 801 kHz on the AM dial

See also

801(k), U.S. tax code for DRIPs